Delia albula is a species of fly in the family Anthomyiidae. It is found in the  Palearctic . For identification see

References

External links
Images representing Delia at BOLD

Anthomyiidae
Insects described in 1825
Muscomorph flies of Europe
Taxa named by Carl Fredrik Fallén